Hume was an electoral district of the Legislative Assembly in the Australian state of New South Wales established in 1859 in the Albury area, named after Hamilton Hume. It did not include the town of Albury after the creation of the electoral district of Albury in 1880. From 1880 to 1894, it elected two members. Following federation, the 1903 NSW referendum decided that the Legislative was to be reduced from 125 to 90 members and in 1904 Hume was abolished and partly replaced by Corowa with the balance absorbed into Albury.

Members for Hume

Election results

References

Former electoral districts of New South Wales
Constituencies established in 1859
1859 establishments in Australia
Constituencies disestablished in 1904
1904 disestablishments in Australia